English Heritage is a registered charity that manages the National Heritage Collection. This comprises over 400 of England's historic buildings, monuments, and sites spanning more than 5,000 years of history. It has direct ownership over some historic sites and also liaises with private owners of sites that are managed under guardianship arrangements.

The following is a list of English Heritage properties containing links for any stately home, historic house, castle, abbey, museum or other property in the care of English Heritage.

Bedfordshire

Berkshire

Bristol

Cambridgeshire

Cheshire

Cornwall

Cumbria

Derbyshire

Devon

Dorset

County Durham

East Riding of Yorkshire

East Sussex

Essex

Gloucestershire

Hampshire

Herefordshire

Hertfordshire

Isle of Wight

Isles of Scilly

Kent

Lancashire

Leicestershire

Lincolnshire

London

Norfolk

North Yorkshire

Northamptonshire

Northumberland

Nottinghamshire

Oxfordshire

Rutland

Shropshire

Somerset

South Yorkshire

Staffordshire

Suffolk

Surrey

Tyne and Wear

Warwickshire

West Midlands

West Sussex

Wiltshire

Worcestershire

See also
List of Cadw properties (Wales)
List of Historic Scotland properties
List of abbeys and priories
List of castles
List of Conservation topics
List of historic houses
List of museums
 List of National Trust properties in England

References

External links 

 English Heritage - Places to Visit

 
English Heritage Properties in England